Ayesha Patricia Rekhi Is the Canadian Ambassador to the Czech Republic.  Appointed at the end of August 2019, she replaces Barbara Richardson.

Rekhi graduated in 1996 with a BA in Political Science from McGill University, in 1997 with a MSc in Development Studies from the London School of Economics and a MPA from Harvard University’s John F. Kennedy School of Government in 2016.

References

External links
Cooking with Cameron: Chef’s time in India inspires film

Canadian women ambassadors
Ambassadors of Canada to the Czech Republic
Harvard Kennedy School alumni
McGill University alumni
Alumni of the London School of Economics
Year of birth missing (living people)
Living people
Canadian people of Indian descent